Alpine is an unincorporated community in Union County, Mississippi.

The Bain Murders of 2012

On May 10, 2012, the bodies of Jo Ann Bain (31) and her oldest daughter Adrienne (14), who allegedly were murdered by Adam Christopher Mayes on April 27, 2012, were found buried in a shallow grave behind the mobile home of Mary Mayes, Adam's mother, in Alpine.

References

Unincorporated communities in Union County, Mississippi
Unincorporated communities in Mississippi